Vancouver Island North is a former federal electoral district in British Columbia, Canada, that was represented in the House of Commons of Canada from 1997 to 2015.

Geography
The district included the Regional Districts of Comox Valley, Strathcona, Mount Waddington and the southern half of Central Coast excluding Calvert Island and Hunter Island. These regional districts include the towns of Campbell River, Comox, Courtenay, Port Alice, Port McNeill, Port Hardy, Alert Bay, Quadra Island, Denman Island and Hornby Island.

History
The electoral district was created in 1996 from Comox—Alberni and North Island—Powell River ridings.

The 2012 electoral redistribution dissolved the riding into the new ridings of North Island—Powell River and Courtenay—Alberni for the 2015 election.

Members of Parliament

This riding elected the following Members of Parliament:

Election results

2011 election

2008 election

2006 election

Nomination contests

2004 election

Nomination contests

2000 election

1997 election

See also
 List of Canadian federal electoral districts
 Past Canadian electoral districts

References

 Library of Parliament Riding Profile
 Expenditures – 2004
 Expenditures – 2000
 Expenditures – 1997

Notes

External links
 Parliament of Canada
 Politwitter
 Project Democracy
 Pundit's Guide
 StatsCan District Profile

Defunct British Columbia federal electoral districts on Vancouver Island
Campbell River, British Columbia
Courtenay, British Columbia